Kupiansk-Vuzlovyi is an urban-type settlement in Kupiansk Raion of Kharkiv Oblast in Ukraine. It is located on the left bank of the Oskil, in the drainage basin of the Don. Kupiansk-Vuzlovyi belongs to Kupiansk urban hromada, one of the hromadas of Ukraine. Population:

History 
The settlement was created in Kharkov Governorate of the Russian Empire to serve the eponymous railway station.

During World War II it was occupied by Axis troops from July 1942 to February 1943.

In 1956 a city club was built here.

In January 1989 the population was 13,196.

Until 18 July 2020, Kupiansk-Vuzlovyi belonged to Kupiansk Municipality. The municipality was abolished in July 2020 as part of the administrative reform of Ukraine, which reduced the number of raions of Kharkiv Oblast to seven. The area of Kupiansk Municipality was merged into Kupiansk Raion.

In 2022, Russia invaded Ukraine and occupied Kupiansk-Vuzlovyi. On September 10, amidst Ukraine's offensive in Kharkiv Oblast, Russian forces retreated from Kupiansk after it was liberated by Ukraine. On September 16, Kupiansk-Vuzlovyi was also liberated.

Economy

Transportation
Kupiansk-Vuzlovyi railway station is a major railway junction which has connections with Kharkiv, Sviatohirsk, Sievierodonetsk, and, via Kupiansk to Stary Oskol in Russia. There are passenger trains along these directions.

The settlement has access to Highway H26 connecting Kharkiv with Sievierodonetsk, as well as by local roads to Borova and further to Izium.

References

Urban-type settlements in Kupiansk Raion